Villiers-Adam is a commune in the Val-d'Oise department in Île-de-France in northern France.

Geography

Climate

Villiers-Adam has a oceanic climate (Köppen climate classification Cfb).

See also
Communes of the Val-d'Oise department

References

External links

Association of Mayors of the Val d'Oise 

Communes of Val-d'Oise